David Mallett (born April 21, 1951) is an American singer-songwriter best known for his authorship of the "folk standard" composition "Garden Song". He has recorded for independent record labels for most of his career.

Biography 
A resident of Maine for most of his life, in the 1980s Mallett relocated to Nashville, and released two albums with the folk and blues label Vanguard. He has since moved back to Maine and established his own label, North Road Records.

Mallett's songs have been recorded by more than 150 artists, including: Pete Seeger, Alison Krauss, John Denver, Arlo Guthrie, Emmylou Harris, Peter, Paul & Mary, Bok, Trickett, Muir, and Liam Clancy. "Garden Song" was even recorded by the Muppets.

"Garden Song" 

Mallett wrote "Garden Song" when he was in his early twenties. He'd been listening to the radio when he went to help his father plant the garden at his homestead in Sebec, Maine. With "music in his head and work at his hands," the first verse came while planting:

Inch by inch, row by row
Gonna make this garden grow
All it takes is a rake and hoe
And a piece of fertile ground

Mallett walked around the yard humming it. The next day, he wrote the second verse at a friend’s house. Being only the third or fourth song he'd written, Mallett regards "Garden Song" as a gift, one that altered the course of his life. It was recorded by John Denver, Pete Seeger, Peter, Paul and Mary, and other acts. The song is likely why the University of Maine gave Mallett an honorary degree in 2014.

Performance 
Mallett frequently performs with violinist Susan Ramsey and bassist Michael Burd, with sound by Tom Gordon. He has recorded 17 albums, including The Fable True in 2007, based on Thoreau's last expedition in 1857. and Alright Now a collection of songs including "Beautiful," dedicated to his daughter Molly.

He has performed in town halls and folk clubs across America and Europe in addition to major venues such as Barns of Wolf Trap, Newport Folk Festival, and Prairie Home Companion. The Bangor Daily News recognized him as one of the 58 most memorable Mainers of the 20th Century. The readers of Folkwax voted him "2003 Artist of the Year" and his album Artist in Me as "2003 Album of the Year".

Legacy
His sons, Will and Luke, perform as The Mallett Brothers Band. The Mallett Brothers Band have a new album, "Live in Portland, Maine" available March 2019.

Discography
David Mallett has released seventeen albums:
1978: David Mallett
1979: Pennsylvania Sunrise
1981: Hard Light
1983: Open Doors and Windows
1986: Vital Signs
1988: For a Lifetime
1993: This Town
1995: In the Falling Dark
1997: Parallel Lives
1999: Ambition
2003: Artist in Me
2006: Midnight on the Water
2007: The Fable True
2009: Alright Now
2012: Greenin' Up
2015: The Horse I Rode In On
2016: Celebration

References

External links
 Official website

1951 births
Living people
People from Piscataquis County, Maine
American singer-songwriters
Vanguard Records artists
Singers from Maine
Songwriters from Maine
American harmonica players
Foxcroft Academy alumni
Flying Fish Records artists